The Deyue Gun Tower is a tower in Jincheng Township, Kinmen County, Fujian Province, Republic of China.

History
The tower was built in 1931 by Huang Hui-huang, a wealthy merchant from Shuitou.

Architecture
The tower stands at a height of 11 meters.

See also
 List of tourist attractions in Taiwan

References

1931 establishments in Taiwan
Buildings and structures in Kinmen County
Jincheng Township
Tourist attractions in Kinmen County
Towers completed in 1931
Towers in Taiwan